Barbara Becker (born November 1, 1966 as Barbara Feltus) is a German-American designer, former actress and model.

Early life
Barbara Becker was born to a Black American father, Harlan Feltus, and a German mother, Ursula. Her father originally went to Europe as a lieutenant in the US medical corps, but became a successful photographer. Her mother was a teacher.

Personal life
Growing up in Germany, she studied acting and dance. Her early career included both modeling and television roles.

In the autumn of 1991, Feltus met international tennis star Boris Becker. They married in 1993. They have two sons, Noah and Elias. In 2001, their marriage ended in divorce.

Starting in 2006, Becker was the UNICEF ambassador for a program to prevent tetanus in developing countries. Between 2006 and 2009 more than 300 million doses of the vaccine were donated.

Becker and artist Arne Quinze announced their engagement on 6 January 2009. They married on 9 September 2009 at their home in Miami, Florida, and celebrated the wedding on 13 September 2009 in Berlin. Both events were photographed by Miami interior designer Sam Robin. Becker and Quinze divorced in 2011.

Currently, Becker lives in Miami, where she creates and promotes fitness videos in addition to designing and promoting home products.

References

External links
Official website (archived)

German film actresses
German television actresses
German fashion designers
Actresses from Munich
German people of African-American descent
1966 births
Living people
Waldorf school alumni
German emigrants to the United States
German women fashion designers